Muhammad Maarifi Mosque is a historical mosque in Kartal district of Istanbul, Turkey, which was once a Rifa'i Tekke.

The area of the mosque was a khanqah of Rufai order which was built by Muhammad Maarifi since 1818. The khanqah was damaged during the 1894 Istanbul earthquake but was soon restored. The 1925 religious reforms banned khanqahs in Turkey, and the facility was turned into a house. By about 1940 the building was derelict except for the prayer hall and tomb. Repairs started in 1964, and in 1976, the building was turned into a mosque. In 1980, a minaret and a sadirvan were built over the mosque.

Muhammed Maarifi
Muhammad Maarifi, a descendant of the prophet Muhammad, was born in Edirne (some say Egypt), and settled in Kartal during the late Ottoman period, where he founded the Maarifiyye Rifa'i Sufi order. When he died, a türbe (mausoleum) was built over his grave. The Maarifi order did not spread much outside of Istanbul, but there were at least two other Maarifi Tekke's, one in Kartal and another on the European side of the city.

References

Ottoman mosques in Istanbul
Mosques completed in 1976
20th-century religious buildings and structures in Turkey